Yonah is a census-designated place in White County, Georgia, United States. Its population was 657 as of the 2020 census. Georgia State Route 75 passes through the community.

History
Yonah is a name derived from the Cherokee language meaning "bear". Among the locals, Yonah is said to be pronounced as a southern way of saying "You’re on a", so Yonah Mountain   sounds like "You’re on a mountain".

Demographics

See also

 List of census-designated places in Georgia (U.S. state)

References

External links

Populated places in White County, Georgia
Census-designated places in Georgia (U.S. state)
Unincorporated communities in Georgia (U.S. state)